The 1989 ABC Under-18 Championship was the tenth edition of the Asian basketball championship for junior women. The tournament took place in Manila, Philippines from January 24 to February 1, 1989. This competition served as a qualifying tournament for 1989 FIBA Under-19 World Championship for Women.

On July 19, 1988, the Basketball Association of the Philippines announced that the Philippines was given hosting rights for the tournament after the country bested bids by Malaysia, Jordan and Thailand for the hosting rights.

 successfully defended their title they won three years ago also held in Manila, this time after defeating  in the championship match.

Format
11 teams took place in this competition. They were divided to Group A of five teams and Group B of six teams. After a round-robin tournament within each group, the first place in Group A faces the second place in Group B in the semi-final and similarly the first place in Group B faces the second place in Group A.

Preliminary round

Group A

Group B

Final round

Semi-final

Final

Final standings

Awards

See also
 1989 ABC Under-18 Championship
 1989 FIBA Under-19 World Championship for Women

References

FIBA Asia Under-18 Championship for Women
ABC Under-18 Championship for Women
ABC Under-18 Championship for Women
International basketball competitions hosted by the Philippines
ABC Under-18 Championship for Women
ABC Under-18 Championship for Women